Guinea-Bissau is divided into 8 regions (singular: região, plural: regiões) and 1 autonomous sector (sector autónomo). The regions are subdivided into a total of 37 sectors (singular: setor, plural: setores) ; which are further subdivided into smaller groups called sections (singular: secção, plural: secções); which are further subdivided into populated places (i.e.: towns, villages, localities, settlements, communities, etc.). Here are the following listed below:

Regions 

The regions can also be grouped into 3 provinces:
Leste (East): Bafatá, Gabu
Norte (North): Biombo, Cacheu, Oio
Sul (South): Bolama, Quinara, Tombali

See also
List of regions of Guinea-Bissau by Human Development Index
ISO 3166-2:GW

References

 
Subdivisions of Guinea-Bissau
Guinea-Bissau, Regions
Guinea-Bissau 1
Regions, Guinea-Bissau
Guinea-Bissau geography-related lists